St. Xavier's High School, Mirzapur, India is an English and Gujarati medium primary and secondary school administered by the Jesuits. It was established in 1935.

History
The Sisters of Mount Carmel founded the school in a few rooms to the right of the present compound. They ran it for a year before handing it over to the Society of Jesus. For need of more space St. Xavier's High School Loyola Hall across the Sabarmati River was opened, and in 1975 become a separate school, eight kilometers away. Plans for a third Xavier high school in Ahmedabad began in 2009, and it was graduating students by 2012.

St. Xavier's is managed by the Xavier Education Society and prepares students for the Secondary and Higher Secondary School Certificate Examination. It includes kindergarten through 12th standard (science and commerce), with parallel classes taught in Gujarati and in English.

Among its sports facilities are a taekwondo center opened in 2016. Yoga was introduced in 2016.

An alumni association, Xaviers Alumni Mirzapur (XAM), was founded in 2014.

In 2014 it began sponsoring a Christmas Carnival that was widely attended, including the Mayor, Bishop, Swami, and cultural groups like the Adivasi dancers.

In 2010 a student from the school ranked 10th in Gujarat state in the science exam for class XII.

At the same time, Dalits might complain that government policy excluding Christians from special reservation privileges, and an early focus on schools in the large cities catering to the better-off, have worked against them.

Images

See also
 List of Jesuit sites
 List of schools named after Francis Xavier

References 

Private schools in Gujarat
Christian schools in Gujarat
Educational institutions established in 1935
1935 establishments in India